Kalvarija is a hill overlooking the city of Maribor in Slovenia.

External links

Hills of Slovenia
Geography of Maribor
Landforms of Styria (Slovenia)